The Xianren Cave (Xiānréndòng), together with the nearby Diaotonghuan (Diàotǒnghuán) rock shelter, is an archaeological site in Dayuan Township, Wannian County in the Jiangxi province, China and a location of historically important discoveries of prehistoric pottery shards and it bears evidence of early rice cultivation. The cave's name refers to the legendary Chinese enlightened people, the Xian "immortals".

A 2012 publication in the Science journal, announced that the earliest pottery yet known anywhere in the world was found at this site dating by radiocarbon to between 20,000 and 19,000 years before present, at the end of the Last Glacial Period. The carbon 14 datation was established by carefully dating surrounding sediments. Many of the pottery fragments had scorch marks, suggesting that the pottery was used for cooking.

These early pottery containers were made well before the invention of agriculture (dated to 10,000 to 8,000 BC), by mobile foragers who hunted and gathered their food during the Late Glacial Maximum.

See also 
 List of caves in China
 List of Neolithic cultures of China

References

Caves of Jiangxi
Major National Historical and Cultural Sites in Jiangxi
Archaeological sites in China
Shangrao
Paleolithic sites in China